"Spanish" is a song by British singer Craig David. It was written by David, Trevor Henry, and Anthony Marshall for his second album Slicker Than Your Average (2002), with production helmed by the latter. The song was released as the album's fourth single and became a tenth top ten hit on the UK Singles Chart, peaking at number 8 and spending six weeks inside the top 75. "Spanish" saw David incorporate Spanish elements into his music for the first time, including a feature by Spanish rapper Duke One. In Australia, "Spanish" was skipped and "World Filled with Love" was released there as the fourth single instead.

Music video
A video for "Spanish" was directed by directing team Calabazitaz.

Track listing

Notes
  signifies an additional producer

Charts

Release history

References

2003 singles
Atlantic Records singles
Craig David songs
Edel AG singles
Songs written by Craig David
Telstar Records singles